Nnamdi Ogbonnaya, also known as Nnamdï (stylized as NNAMDÏ), is an American multi-instrumentalist and singer-songwriter based in Chicago, Illinois. He is a founder of the record label Sooper Records.

Born in California to Nigerian immigrants, Ogbonnaya first moved to Ohio. He spent most of his childhood in Lansing, Illinois. He earned an electrical engineering degree at the University of Illinois at Chicago.

He released Bootie Noir in 2013, Feckin Weirdo in 2014, Drool in 2017, Brat in 2020, and Please Have A Seat in 2022.

Discography

Studio albums
 Bootie Noir (2013)
 Feckin Weirdo (2014)
 Drool (2017)
 Brat (2020)
 Krazy Karl (2020)
 Please Have a Seat (2022)

EPs
 Despondent (2013)

Singles
 "You Like" (2017)
 "Love to See" (2018)
 "Price Went Up" (2019)

References

External links
 

Living people
Year of birth missing (living people)
American people of Nigerian descent
American multi-instrumentalists
21st-century American male musicians
University of Illinois Chicago alumni